Hans-Heinrich Winkler (sometimes listed as Hans-Heinrich Wickler) was an East German luger who competed in the mid-1970s. He won the bronze medal in the men's singles event at the 1976 FIL European Luge Championships in Hammarstrand, Sweden.

Winkler also finished fourth in the men's singles event at the 1976 Winter Olympics in Innsbruck though his surname was misspelled as Wickler.

References
List of European luge champions 
Wallechinsky, David. (1984). "Luge - Men's singles". The Complete Book of the Olympics: 1896-1980. New York: Penguin Books. p. 575.

German male lugers
Living people
Lugers at the 1976 Winter Olympics
Year of birth missing (living people)